The third season of The New Adventures of Old Christine premiered on CBS on Monday nights from 9:30/8:30 pm from February 4, 2008 and concluded on March 31, 2008. It was the last season to air on Monday nights. It was originally intended to have 13 episodes, since CBS scheduled the series as a midseason replacement, but due to the Writer's Strike, it was shortened to 10 episodes. It is the shortest season of the series.

In this season, Christine and Mr. Harris have a smooth going relationship, until Christine's schedule becomes too hectic midway through the season causing Mr. Harris to leave her. Meanwhile, Richard and New Christine take their relationship up a notch and buy a house together, which coincidentally is Christine's dream house leaving her feeling jealous and confused. Barb leaves her husband and she has a short-lived fling with Matthew much to Christine's horror. On August 13, 2008, CBS announced that The New Adventures of Old Christine will be moving to Wednesday nights after Summer 2008, after Welcome to the Captain's cancellation.

This season marks the reunion between Julia Louis-Dreyfus and Jason Alexander, who previously worked together in Seinfeld.

Wanda Sykes, who plays the role of Barb, was upgraded to series regular status for this season.

Cast and characters

Main
 Julia Louis-Dreyfus as "Old" Christine Campbell
 Clark Gregg as Richard Campbell
 Hamish Linklater as Matthew Kimble
 Trevor Gagnon as Ritchie Campbell
 Emily Rutherfurd as "New" Christine Hunter
 Tricia O'Kelley and Alex Kapp Horner as Marly and Lindsay (a.k.a. "The Meanie Moms")
 Wanda Sykes as Barbara 'Barb' Baran

Recurring
 Blair Underwood as Daniel Harris
 Lily Goff as Ashley Ehrhardt
 Marissa Blanchard as Kelsey

Guest stars
 Andy Richter as Stan
 Tom Papa as Mike Gay
 Mary Beth McDonough as Mrs. Wilhoite
 Stephanie Faracy as Dr. Jacobson
 Ben Feldman as Timmy
 Gigi Rice as Shelley
 Dave Foley as Tom
 Jason Alexander as Dr. Palmer

Episodes

Ratings

References

2008 American television seasons